Carlyle is a given name and surname. Surname (and place name) is derived from Carlisle. Given name may be an elaboration of Carl. Notable people with the name include the following:

Given name

Carlyle Atkinson (1892–1968), English swimmer
Carlyle Begay, Diné-American politician
Carlyle Blackwell (1884–1955), American silent film actor, director and producer
Carlyle Brown, American playwright, performer and the artistic director
Carlyle W. Crane (1914–1992), American politician
Carlyle Crockwell (1932–2015), Bermudian football referee
Carlyle Eubank, American writer and screenwriter
Carlyle Glean (1932–2021), Grenadian politician
Carlyle Harmon (1905–1997), American inventor
Carlyle Harris (1868–1893), American medical student
Carlyle Holiday (born 1981), American football player
Carlyle Jones (1904–1951), Australian rules footballer
Carlyle A. Luer (1922–2019), American botanist
Carlyle E. Maw (1903–1987), American politician
Carlyle Miller (born 1930), Guyanese cricketer
Carlyle Mitchell (born 1987), Trinidadian footballer
Carlyle Moore Jr. (1909–1977), American actor
Carlyle Tapsell (1909–1975), Indian field hockey player
Carlyle Thompson (born 1988), Bahamian sprinter
Carlyle Witton-Davies (1913–1993), Welsh Anglican priest and scholar

Middle name

Robert Carlyle Byrd, fullname of Robert Byrd (1917–2010), American politician
Thomas Carlyle Ford, fullname of Tom Ford (born 1961), American fashion designer and filmmaker
Thomas Johnstone Carlyle Gifford (1881–1975), Scottish businessperson
Paige Carlyle Howard, fullname of Paige Howard (born 1985), American actress
John Carlyle Kenley (1892–1965), Australian footballer (Australian rules)
Todd Carlyle MacCulloch, fullname of Todd MacCulloch (born 1976), Canadian basketball player 
David Carlyle Rocastle, fullname of David Rocastle (1967–2001), English professional footballer

Surname

Aelred Carlyle (1874–1955), English Benedictine monk
Alexander Carlyle (1722–1805), Scottish church leader
Buddy Carlyle (born 1977), American baseball player
Cleo Carlyle (1902–1967), American baseball player
Jane Welsh Carlyle (1801–1866), Scottish writer
Joan Carlyle (born 1931), British soprano
John Carlyle (disambiguation), several people
Joseph Dacre Carlyle (1759–1804), British orientalist
Florence Carlyle (1864–1923), Canadian painter 
Francis Carlyle (1912–1975), American magician
Liz Carlyle (born 1958), American writer 
Mara Carlyle (born 1970s), British singer-songwriter and arranger
Paul Carlyle (born 1967), Northern Irish footballer and manager
Randy Carlyle (born 1956), Canadian ice hockey player and coach
Reuven Carlyle (born 1965), American politician
Richard Carlyle (1914–2009), American actor
Richard Carlyle (actor, born 1879) (1879–1942), Canadian-born actor
Robert Carlyle (born 1961), Scottish actor
Roy Carlyle (1900–1956), American baseball player
Steve Carlyle (born 1950), Canadian ice hockey player and coach
Thomas Carlyle (1795–1881), Scottish essayist, historian and philosopher
Thomas Carlyle (lawyer) (1803–1855), Scottish lawyer and apostle of the Catholic Apostolic Church
Walter Carlyle (1938–2007), Scottish footballer 
Warren Carlyle, English theatre director and choreographer

Fictional characters 
Boone Carlyle, fictional character on the television series Lost
Luke Carlyle, a Marvel Comic Book character
Lucy Carlyle, main protagonist of the YA book series Lockwood & Co. by Jonathan Stroud

See also

Carlile (given name)
Carlile (surname)
Carlyle (disambiguation)